Mina is an album by Italian singer Mina, issued in 1964. It was her first album to reach Italian Top. It was also the first album that Mina recorded for the label Ri-Fi and the first album composed of tracks expressly sung for. In 1967, the label Philips published a cassette tape of the album all over Europe under the title of Many Faces of Mina.

Over the years, Mina re-recorded some of the songs of this album. In 1988, she sang again "E se domani" for her compilation album Oggi ti amo di più. In 1993 and in 2012, she made a new cover of "Everything Happens to Me" (respectively in Lochness and in 12 (american song book)). In 2005, in her tribute album to Frank Sinatra, L'allieva, she sang again the standards "The Nearness of You" and "Angel Eyes", while - in 1964 - she made a Spanish version of "E se domani" under the title of "Y si mañana".

Track listing

1964 albums
Mina (Italian singer) albums
Italian-language albums